Kalesmeno is a community within the municipality of Karpenisi in Greece. In 2011 its population was 97.

References

Populated places in Evrytania